Ebenezer is an unincorporated community located in the town of Watertown, in Jefferson County, Wisconsin, United States.

Notable person
Edwin E. Witte, educator and economist

Notes

Unincorporated communities in Wisconsin
Unincorporated communities in Jefferson County, Wisconsin